Kunku (Marathi title) is a 1937 Marathi classic social drama film directed by V. Shantaram, and based on the  novel, Na Patnari Goshta by Narayan Hari Apte, who also wrote film's screenplay. The film was simultaneously shot and released in Hindi as Duniya Na Maane.

The movie went on to become both a critical and commercial success, and was shown at the Venice International Film Festival. The film is now hailed for "its daring attack on the treatment of women in Indian society." and depiction of child marriage.

For film's lead actress, Shanta Apte, it was third most memorable performance in a row, after V.Shantaram's previous classics, Amrit Manthan (1934) and Amar Jyoti (1936). Besides other songs, she also sang a full-fledged English song in the film: "A Psalm of Life", written by Henry Wadsworth Longfellow (1807–1882).

Plot
A young woman, Nirmala (Shanta Apte), known affectionately as Neera, is orphaned and comes to live in the house of her maternal uncle. His wife, a very good lady, urges her husband to do his duty and arrange for Nirmala to marry a suitable young man. The uncle finally brings a family to meet his niece, consisting of a handsome young man, his much younger brother, his middle aged father and his widowed aunt (father's sister). The meeting is cordial, and a few days later, Nirmala's uncle comes home with the news that the boy's family have agreed to the match. On the day of the wedding, while Nirmala sits inside a room like a demure bride, her aunt is at the gate to receive the groom with aarti. She is horrified and faints when she discovers that the elderly father is the groom! When she recovers, her husband tells her sternly not to make a scene but to ensure that Nirmala goes quietly with her husband, the much older widower, Kaka Saheb (Keshavrao Date).

The story is based on a novel by Shri. Narayan Hari Apte.  It reminds us instinctively of the story of Sharada, a play by Deval  which had long been a classic of Marathi theatre.
Neera, a young girl, is married off to an old widower by her foster-parents, an uncle and his orthodox wife. The deal is obviously motivated by considerations of money. The shock of the marriage is too much for the girl, but she bravely tries to accommodate herself in the house. The widower deceives himself into believing that he is still not old enough to have lost his manhood. His college-going son tries to flirt with his young stepmother, while a widowed daughter of his sympathises with her in her woe. The marriage does not work. Some cheer is added to Neera's life through the company of a teenage girl belonging to the household. However, when the old man fully realises the implications of his action, he commits suicide, leaving the girl he has married against her will to go her own way.

Music
The songs are from the lead actress Shanta Apte even sung.  Shantaram Athavale wrote the lyrics to the music of Keshavrao Bhole.  The English text of the song in the world's broad field of battle ... Be not like dumb, driven cattle is a poem by Henry Wadsworth Longfellow.

Cast

 Shanta Apte as Nirmala
 K. Date as Kakasaheb
 Raja Nene as Jugat
 Vimala Vasishta as the Aunt
 Shakuntala Paranjpye as Sushila
 Master Chhotu

Shanta Apte	...	Nirmala
Keshavrao Date	Keshavrao Date	...	Keshavlal Pleader
Vimala Vasishta	Vimala Vasishta	...	Chachi (as Vimalabai Vasistha)
Shakuntala Paranjpye	Shakuntala Paranjpye	...	Sushila
Vasanti	Vasanti	...	Shanta
Raja Nene	Raja Nene	...	Jugal
Gauri	Gauri	...	Mami
Chhotu	Chhotu	...	Mama
Rest of cast listed alphabetically:
Karmarkar	Karmarkar

References

Ashish Rajadhyaksha, Paul Willemen: Encyclopedia of Indian Cinema, S. 272

External links

 Full movie on YouTube
 Full movie on Dailymotion
 Songs from Duniya Na Mane 1937 and screenshots

1937 films
Indian black-and-white films
Films directed by V. Shantaram
1930s Hindi-language films
Indian feminist films
Films about women in India
Films based on Indian novels
Prabhat Film Company films
Articles containing video clips
Indian drama films
1937 drama films
Indian multilingual films
1937 multilingual films
1930s Marathi-language films